Saotho Sitchefboontham is a Thai Muay Thai fighter.

Titles and accomplishments

 2019 Rajadamnern Stadium 118 lbs Champion (defended once)
 2019 Rajadamnern Stadium Fighter of the Year

Fight record

|-  style="background:#fbb;"
| 2023-02-21||Loss ||align=left| Kumandoi PetchyindeeAcademy  || Muaymansananmuanng|| Bangkok, Thailand || Decision || 5||3:00
|-  style="background:#fbb;"
| 2023-01-28|| Loss ||align=left| Yokmorakot Wor.Sangprapai ||Suek Muay Mahakuson Samakom Chao Paktai  || Bangkok, Thailand || Decision  || 5||3:00
|-  style="background:#cfc;"
| 2022-11-18 || Win ||align=left| Patakpetch VK.KhaoYai || Ruamponkon + Prachin || Prachinburi province, Thailand || Decision  || 5||3:00
|-  style="background:#cfc;"
| 2022-10-07|| Win||align=left| Petchsila Wor.Auracha ||Petchyindee || Maha Sarakham province, Thailand || KO (Elbow) || 3 ||  
|-  style="background:#cfc;"
| 2022-09-11|| Win||align=left| Pirapat Muayded789 || Petchyindee, Rajadamnern Stadium ||Bangkok, Thailand ||Decision  || 5 || 3:00
|-  style="background:#fbb;"
| 2022-07-21 || Loss||align=left| Phetpailin Sor.Jor.Tongprachin ||Singpatong, Patong Stadium || Phuket province, Thailand ||Decision  || 5 || 3:00
|-  style="background:#fbb;"
| 2022-05-12 || Loss||align=left| Pirapat Muayded789 ||Petchyindee, Rajadamnern Stadium || Bangkok, Thailand || Decision  || 5 || 3:00
|-  style="background:#cfc;"
| 2022-03-31|| Win ||align=left| PetchAnuwat Nor.AnuwatGym || Petchyindee, Rajadamnern Stadium || Bangkok, Thailand || KO (Elbow)|| 3 ||
|-  style="background:#cfc;"
| 2022-02-18|| Win ||align=left| Yokmorakot Wor.Sangprapai || Muaymanwansuk True4U, Rangsit Stadium || Rangsit, Thailand || Decision (split)|| 5 ||3:00 

|-  style="background:#fbb;"
| 2021-11-25|| Loss ||align=left| Diesellek Wor.Wanchai || Petchyindee True4U, Rangsit Stadium || Rangsit, Thailand || Decision || 5 ||3:00 
|-
! style=background:white colspan=9 |

|-  style="background:#cfc;"
| 2021-04-07|| Win ||align=left| Mohawk Teeded99 || Chefboontham, Rangsit Stadium|| Rangsit, Thailand || Decision || 5 || 3:00

|-  style="background:#fbb;"
| 2020-12-11|| Loss ||align=left| Puenkon Tor.Surat|| True4U Muaymanwansuk, Rangsit Stadium || Pathum Thani, Thailand ||Decision ||5 ||3:00
|- style="background:#c5d2ea;"
|2020-11-09
|Draw
| align="left" | Suesat Paeminburi
|Chef Boontham, Rangsit Stadium
|Pathum Thani, Thailand
|Decision
|5
|3:00
|-  style="background:#fbb;"
| 2020-10-05|| Loss ||align=left| Suesat Paeminburi ||  R1 UFA, World Siam Stadium || Bangkok, Thailand || Decision ||5 ||3:00
|-  style="background:#cfc;"
| 2020-09-12|| Win ||align=left| Eakalak Sor.SamarnGarment || OrTorGor.3 Stadium || Nonthaburi, Thailand || Decision || 5 || 3:00
|-  style="background:#fbb;"
| 2020-08-04|| Loss||align=left| Kumandoi Petcharoenvit || Chef Boontham, Thanakorn Stadium || Nakhon Pathom Province, Thailand || Decision || 5 || 3:00
|-  style="background:#fbb;"
| 2020-03-12|| Loss ||align=left| Kumandoi Petcharoenvit || Rajadamnern Stadium || Bangkok, Thailand || Decision || 5 || 3:00
|-  style="background:#cfc;"
| 2020-01-23|| Win ||align=left| Methee Sor.Jor.Toipaedriew || Rajadamnern Stadium || Bangkok, Thailand || KO (Right Middle Kick)|| 3  ||
|-  style="background:#cfc;"
| 2019-12-23|| Win ||align=left| Phetbankek Sor.Sommai || Rajadamnern Stadium || Bangkok, Thailand || Decision || 5 || 3:00
|-  style="background:#cfc;"
| 2019-11-21|| Win ||align=left| Diesellek Wor.Wanchai || Rajadamnern Stadium || Bangkok, Thailand || Decision || 5 || 3:00
|-  style="background:#c5d2ea;"
| 2019-10-20|| Draw||align=left| Mutsuki Ebata || SNKA MAGNUM 51 || Tokyo, Japan || Decision || 5 || 3:00
|-
! style=background:white colspan=9 |
|-  style="background:#cfc;"
| 2019-08-15|| Win ||align=left| Nongyot Sitjekan  || Rajadamnern Stadium || Bangkok, Thailand || Decision || 5 || 3:00
|-  style="background:#cfc;"
| 2019-06-27|| Win ||align=left|  Kongsak Sor.Satra  || Rajadamnern Stadium || Bangkok, Thailand || KO (Left Elbow) || 3 ||
|-  style="background:#cfc;"
| 2019-05-16|| Win ||align=left| Phetthanakit JSP  || Rajadamnern Stadium || Bangkok, Thailand || Decision || 5 || 3:00
|-  style="background:#cfc;"
| 2019-03-15|| Win ||align=left| Ekwayu Mor.Bankkokthonburi  || Lumpinee Stadium || Bangkok, Thailand || Decision || 5 || 3:00
|-  style="background:#cfc;"
| 2019-01-23|| Win ||align=left| Kongsak Sor.Satra || Rajadamnern Stadium || Bangkok, Thailand || Decision || 5 || 3:00
|-
! style=background:white colspan=9 |
|-  style="background:#cfc;"
| 2018-12-19|| Win ||align=left| Yodwittaya Sirilakmuaythai || Rajadamnern Stadium || Bangkok, Thailand || Decision || 5 || 3:00
|-  style="background:#cfc;"
| 2018-11-15|| Win ||align=left| Suemit Mor.Puwana || Rajadamnern Stadium || Bangkok, Thailand || KO (Left Elbow)|| 4 ||
|-  style="background:#c5d2ea;"
| 2018-10-10|| Draw ||align=left| Detchaiya Petchyindee || Rajadamnern Stadium || Bangkok, Thailand || Decision || 5 || 3:00
|-  style="background:#fbb;"
| 2018-09-06|| Loss ||align=left| Kongsak Sor.Satra || Rajadamnern Stadium || Bangkok, Thailand || Decision || 5 || 3:00
|-  style="background:#cfc;"
| 2018-07-19|| Win ||align=left| Samingdam Miamicondobangpu || Rajadamnern Stadium || Bangkok, Thailand || Decision || 5 || 3:00
|-  style="background:#fbb;"
| 2018-05-18|| Loss ||align=left| Thongrob Lukbanyai || Rajadamnern Stadium || Bangkok, Thailand || Decision || 5 || 3:00
|-  style="background:#cfc;"
| 2018-03-22|| Win ||align=left| Kaokrai Chor.Hapayak || Rajadamnern Stadium || Bangkok, Thailand || Decision || 5 || 3:00
|-  style="background:#cfc;"
| 2018-02-22|| Win ||align=left| Rambong Lezorkanka || Rajadamnern Stadium || Bangkok, Thailand || Decision || 5 || 3:00
|-  style="background:#cfc;"
| 2018-01-25|| Win ||align=left| Chalawan Attachaimuaythai || Rajadamnern Stadium || Bangkok, Thailand || Decision || 5 || 3:00
|-  style="background:#cfc;"
| 2017-12-25|| Win ||align=left| Phetbankek Sor.Sommai || Rajadamnern Stadium || Bangkok, Thailand || Decision || 5 || 3:00
|-  style="background:#cfc;"
| 2017-11-15|| Win ||align=left| Phetthanakit JSP || Rajadamnern Stadium || Bangkok, Thailand || Decision || 5 || 3:00
|-  style="background:#cfc;"
| 2017-09-27|| Win ||align=left| Chatploy Por.Poonsawat ||Rajadamnern Stadium || Bangkok, Thailand || Decision || 5 || 3:00
|-  style="background:#cfc;"
| 2017-08-23|| Win ||align=left| Phettamaew So.Sattra ||Rajadamnern Stadium || Bangkok, Thailand || Decision || 5 || 3:00
|-  style="background:#cfc;"
| 2017-07-05|| Win ||align=left| Thanadet Thor.Pan 49 || Rajadamnern Stadium || Bangkok, Thailand || Decision || 5 || 3:00
|-  style="background:#cfc;"
| 2017-05-22|| Win ||align=left| Chawarit Kiatchaiyuth || Rajadamnern Stadium || Bangkok, Thailand || Decision || 5 || 3:00
|-  style="background:#fbb;"
| 2017-04-27|| Loss ||align=left| Thanadet Thor.Pan 49 || Rajadamnern Stadium || Bangkok, Thailand || Decision || 5 || 3:00
|-  style="background:#fbb;"
| 2017-03-09|| Loss ||align=left| Kongthoranee Sor.Sommai || Rajadamnern Stadium ||Bangkok, Thailand || Decision || 5 || 3:00
|-  style="background:#c5d2ea;"
| 2017-01-04|| Draw ||align=left| Phetthanakit JSP || Rajadamnern Stadium || Bangkok, Thailand || Decision || 5 || 3:00
|-  style="background:#cfc;"
| 2016-12-08|| Win ||align=left| Chatphet Sor.Punsawat || Rajadamnern Stadium || Bangkok, Thailand || Decision || 5 || 3:00
|-  style="background:#cfc;"
| 2016-11-16|| Win ||align=left| Phettamaew So.Sattra || || Thailand || Decision || 5 || 3:00
|-  style="background:#cfc;"
| 2016-09-15|| Win ||align=left| Kongsak Sor.Satra || Rajadamnern Stadium || Bangkok, Thailand || Decision || 5 || 3:00
|-  style="background:#fbb;"
| 2016-08-10|| Loss ||align=left| Phetthanakit JSP || Rajadamnern Stadium || Bangkok, Thailand || Decision || 5 || 3:00
|-  style="background:#fbb;"
| 2016-07-04|| Loss ||align=left| Phetthanakit JSP || Rajadamnern Stadium || Bangkok, Thailand || Decision || 5 || 3:00
|-  style="background:#cfc;"
| 2016-06-06|| Win ||align=left| Kaokrai Chor.Hapayak|| Rajadamnern Stadium || Bangkok, Thailand || Decision || 5 || 3:00
|-  style="background:#cfc;"
| 2016-05-12|| Win ||align=left| Phetchiangkwan Nayoksomdet || Rajadamnern Stadium || Bangkok, Thailand || Decision || 5 || 3:00
|-  style="background:#cfc;"
| 2016-04-21|| Win ||align=left| Den Sor.PhetUdon || Rajadamnern Stadium || Bangkok, Thailand || Decision || 5 || 3:00
|-  style="background:#cfc;"
| 2016-03-30|| Win ||align=left| Kaokrai Chor.Hapayak|| Rajadamnern Stadium || Bangkok, Thailand || Decision || 5 || 3:00
|-  style="background:#cfc;"
| 2016-03-07|| Win ||align=left| Tuakeaw Khunpanpasak|| Rajadamnern Stadium || Bangkok, Thailand || Decision || 5 || 3:00
|-  style="background:#fbb;"
| 2016-02-11|| Loss ||align=left| Den Sor.PhetUdon || Rajadamnern Stadium || Bangkok, Thailand || Decision || 5 || 3:00
|-  style="background:#cfc;"
| 2015-09-27|| Win ||align=left| Jacksaim Maxjandee || Lat Phrao Boxing Stadium || Thailand || Decision || 5 || 3:00
|-  style="background:#fbb;"
| 2015-09-02|| Loss ||align=left| Phetnamnueng Sipanomgym || Rajadamnern Stadium || Bangkok, Thailand || KO || 4 ||
|-  style="background:#fbb;"
| 2015-07-21|| Loss ||align=left| Chok Phor.Pat   || Lumpinee Stadium || Bangkok, Thailand || Decision || 5 || 3:00
|-  style="background:#cfc;"
| 2015-05-22|| Win ||align=left| Buriram Sasiprapagym   || Lumpinee Stadium || Bangkok, Thailand || Decision || 5 || 3:00
|-  style="background:#cfc;"
| 2015-03-27|| Win ||align=left| Manachai O.Bangna  || Lumpinee Stadium || Bangkok, Thailand || Decision || 5 || 3:00
|-  style="background:#cfc;"
| 2015-02-24|| Win ||align=left| Pettungyung Kelasport  || Lumpinee Stadium || Bangkok, Thailand || Decision || 5 || 3:00
|-  style="background:#cfc;"
| 2015-01-25|| Win ||align=left| Thanachai Sor.Jor.Vichitpedriew  || Rajadamnern Stadium || Bangkok, Thailand || Decision || 5 || 3:00
|-  style="background:#cfc;"
| 2014-12-27|| Win ||align=left| Newclear Jayutkongseup  || Rajadamnern Stadium|| Bangkok, Thailand || Decision || 5 || 3:00 
|-
| colspan=9 | Legend:

References

Saotho Sitchefboontham
Living people
1997 births